"Te Extraño" (English: "I Miss You") is a song by American group Xtreme. It serve as the first single for their self titled debut album, Xtreme (2005). The song was originally recorded in 2003 for their original first album, We Got Next (2003). They were independent at the time until they were signed with Sergio George's SGZ Entertainment in 2005 and then remade the song in 2005 as their debut single. An R&B version is also included on both albums.

Music video
The music video shows the group, which included Elvis Rosario before his departure, performing on a stage while a few females watch them on a TV screen.

Charts

References

2005 singles
2003 songs
Xtreme (group) songs